Mervin may refer to:


People
 Mervin (given name), a list of people with this name
 Barbara Mervin (born 1982), Canadian rugby union player
 Edmund Mervin, Anglican Archdeacon of Surrey from 1556 to 1559

Places
 Rural Municipality of Mervin No. 499, Saskatchewan, Canada
 Mervin, Saskatchewan, a village

Businesses
 Mervin Manufacturing, an American snowboard manufacturer

See also
 Mervyn, a related name
 Merwin (disambiguation)

Surnames of Breton origin